The Jaunpur-Bhojpur war (also known as the Jaunpur-Ujjainiya war), refers to the conflict between the Jaunpur Sultanate and the Ujjainiya Rajput chiefs of the Bhojpur region of Bihar.

Background
According to the seventeenth-century khyat which contains the history of the Ujjainiyas, noted that in 1389, the sultan of Jaunpur crossed the Karmanasa River and halted in Buxar which is a holy city in Hinduism and received a lot of pilgrims. His main motivation for advancing to this position was that he coveted control of the ferry of Chausa.
Upon their arrival, they noticed Brahmins performing prayers and rituals. They proceeded to disturb and interfere with the rituals which drew the attention of the Ujjainiyas. The Ujjainiyas were initially successful in driving the Jaunpur Sultanate out of the region however they later returned plundered the city, destroying the temples in the process. The Ujjainiyas were then forced to flee into the forests.

Guerilla resistance
After their defeat, the Ujjainiyas retreated into the hills and forests and continued to harass the forces of the Jaunpur Sultanate. After the death of Sultan Malik Sarwar in 1399, many Ujjainiyas felt it safe to return from living in the forest. However, for certain periods throughout the 1400s, many Ujjainiyas had to return to living in the forests. By the latter half of the 1400s, many Ujjaniyas were paying tribute to the Jaunpur Sultan as the Ujjainiya chief at the time, Durlabh Deva had accepted their suzerainty. This continued until the Jaunpur Sultanate was eventually absorbed into the Lodi dynasty.

See also
Bengal Sultanate-Jaunpur Sultanate War

References

History of Bihar
Military history of India
Battles involving the Rajputs
Jaunpur Sultanate